Zar Sonowk (also Romanized as Zar Sanūk, Zarsenūk, Zar Sūnūk, and Zaz Sanook) is a village in Momenabad Rural District, in the Central District of Sarbisheh County, South Khorasan Province, Iran. At the 2006 census, its population was 32, in 11 families.

References 

Populated places in Sarbisheh County